The 20th European Badminton Championships were held in Den Bosch, Netherlands, between 12 and 16 April 2006.

Medalists

Results

Men's singles

Women's singles

Men's doubles

Women's doubles

Mixed doubles

Medal count

References

External links 
Official site
European Championships 2006 at tournamentsoftware.com

European Badminton Championships
European Badminton Championships
B
Badminton tournaments in the Netherlands
International sports competitions hosted by the Netherlands
Sports competitions in 's-Hertogenbosch